Taranga Gogoi  is an Indian politician.  As an MLA for the Bharatiya Janata Party, he was elected to the Naharkatia constituency in the 2021 Assam Legislative Assembly election.

References 

Bharatiya Janata Party politicians from Assam
Living people
People from Dibrugarh district
Assam MLAs 2021–2026
Year of birth missing (living people)